Alexandra Kristin Powers is an American former actress.

Early life
Powers was born in New York City. She grew up in an 'artsy, liberal environment' on both coasts with her divorced parents. Her father teaches acting.  She said in an interview that her parents "encouraged me to find my own truth". Commenting on her faith, she stated "I pray whenever I feel sad. And I believe that whatever is right will work out."  In that same interview, she said that her father was Roman Catholic and her mother Katharyn Powers was interested in metaphysics. Powers' mother wrote for television programs including Fantasy Island and Charlie's Angels. At the age of six, Powers announced her intentions to become an actress.

Career
Powers appeared in various television and film roles, including Cast a Deadly Spell, 21 Jump Street, and Dead Poets Society. In the film Rising Sun, Powers portrayed a prostitute who attempted to seduce the character played by actor Wesley Snipes. She also had a recurring role on the NBC legal drama L.A. Law. She portrayed "Dusty Brown" in the NBC miniseries A Matter of Justice. On being successfully cast in the NBC program Tonya and Nancy, Powers commented, "In a lot of ways, it's the role of the year". For the program, she received ice-skating lessons from Dody Teachman, former coach to Tonya Harding. In a review for The Orlando Sentinel, Powers received a positive reception: "It should be said that Powers, the Christian lawyer on L.A. Law, is a dead ringer for Tonya ... and that she delivers a convincing performance."

Personal life
In the late 1990s she became a Scientologist, and by 2000 had married Gavin Potter and joined the Sea Organization, the religious order of the Church of Scientology.
Powers previously said she did not adhere to any religion: "I've sort of looked and searched. I was a Buddhist for about six months." She was married to actor Barry Sherman in December 1993. Powers lamented, "I have to take my ring off when I go to work. And that makes me sad, because I put the ring on and I don't want to ever have to take it off."

Filmography

Film

Television

References

External links
 

Living people
American child actresses
American film actresses
American television actresses
Actresses from New York City
Former Buddhists
People from Manhattan
American Scientologists
20th-century American actresses
Year of birth missing (living people)